Công Kim Hoa was born in Hanoi in 1962 and graduated from the Hanoi College of Fine Art in 1985. She is known for her lacquer painting.

Hoa comes from an artistic family. Her parents are Cong Ton Toan and Dinh Thi Lieu. Her brother Công Quốc Hà is also a lacquer painter.

References

External links 
 Images of Công Kim Hoa's work on MutualArt

1962 births
Living people
Vietnamese women artists
People from Hanoi
20th-century Vietnamese painters
21st-century Vietnamese painters
20th-century women artists
21st-century women artists
21st-century Vietnamese women